Maritime call signs are call signs assigned as unique identifiers to ships and boats. All radio transmissions must be individually identified by the call sign. Merchant and naval vessels are assigned call signs by their national licensing authorities.

History
One of the earliest applications of radiotelegraph operation, long predating broadcast radio, were marine radio stations installed aboard ships at sea. In the absence of international standards, early transmitters constructed after Guglielmo Marconi's first transatlantic message in 1901 were issued arbitrary two-letter calls by radio companies, alone or later preceded by a one-letter company identifier. These mimicked an earlier railroad telegraph convention where short, two-letter identifiers served as Morse code abbreviations to denote the various individual stations on the line (for instance, AX could represent Halifax). "N" and two letters would identify U.S. Navy; "M" and two letters would be a Marconi station.

Later that same year, an international conference standardised radio call signs so that the first two letters would uniquely identify a transmitter's country of origin.

Merchant and naval vessels are assigned call signs by their national licensing authorities. In the case of states such as Liberia or Panama, which are flags of convenience for ship registration, call signs for larger vessels consist of the national prefix plus three letters (for example, 3LXY, and sometimes followed by a number, i.e. 3LXY2). United States merchant vessels are given call signs beginning with the letters "W" or "K" while U.S. naval ships are assigned call signs beginning with "N". Originally, both ships and broadcast stations were given call signs in this series consisting of three or four letters, but as demand for both marine radio and broadcast call signs grew, gradually American-flagged vessels were given longer call signs with mixed letters and numbers.

As broadcast stations became commonplace in the 1920s, some original three- and four-letter call signs were reassigned as the corresponding ships were removed from U.S. registry. Similarly, WEZU, the international radio call sign of the ship , was assigned in 1997 to a broadcast station. Additional call signs would be reassigned to coastal stations or moved from marine radio to terrestrial broadcast radio when ships were sold for registration to foreign nations, as the new owners would obtain new, local call signs for any existing shipboard radio stations.

Leisure craft with VHF radios may not be assigned call signs, in which case the name of the vessel is used instead. Ships in the U.S. wishing to have a radio licence anyway are under FCC Radio Service Code SA: "Ship Recreational or Voluntarily Equipped". Those calls follow the land mobile format of the initial letter K or W followed by 1 or 2 letters followed by 3 or 4 numbers (such as KX0983 or WXX0029).

U.S. Coast Guard small boats have a number that is shown on both bows (i.e. port and starboard) in which the first two digits indicate the nominal length of the boat in feet. For example, Coast Guard 47021 refers to the 21st in the series of 47-foot motor lifeboats. The call sign might also be abbreviated to the final two or three numbers during operations, for example: Coast Guard zero two one.

See also
 Maritime Mobile Service Identity
 Pan-pan

References

Call signs
Call sign
Ship names